Fortuyn (also spelled Fortuin) was a ship owned by the Chamber of Amsterdam of the Dutch East India Company (commonly abbreviated to VOC) that was lost on its maiden voyage in 1723.  It set sail for Batavia from Texel in the Netherlands on 27 September 1723. The ship reached the Cape of Good Hope on 2 January 1724, and continued on its voyage on 18 January. Fortuyn was never seen again and its fate is a matter of speculation.

On its maiden voyage it was commanded by Pieter Westrik and had a crew of 225 men.

Location 
Although VOC ships were not supposed to run within sight of the South Land (Australia) at that time of the year, it may have inadvertently sailed too far east and been wrecked off the Western Australian coast.

The Australian National Shipwreck Database records the ship as "possibly wrecked near Cocos Island".

See also
List of people who disappeared mysteriously at sea

References

Further reading
 

1720s missing person cases
1720s ships
Lost sailing vessels
Maritime incidents in 1724
Missing ships of Australia
People lost at sea
Ships lost with all hands
Ships of the Dutch East India Company
Shipwrecks of Western Australia